Bnot Sakhnin is an Arab-Israeli women's football club from Sakhnin competing in the Israeli First League and the Israeli Women's Cup.

History
The club was established in 1999 as a youth club, and in 2002 joined the senior league., reaching their best placing, 4th, in 2009–10. The club twice, in 2013 and 2014 finished second bottom of the first division and had to play a promotion/relegation play-off match against the second division's runners-up, twice winning and retaining its first division status.

In the cup, the club's best achievement is reaching the semi-finals in 2010, losing 1–2 to Maccabi Be’er Sheva, and in 2012, losing 0–5 to ASA Tel Aviv University.

Youth teams
The club operates a u-19 and u-16 teams, which had won several titles, the u-19 team won the state championship and the u-19 state cup in 2013–14, as well as regional league titles in 2009 and 2011, while the u-16 team won the state championship and the u-16 state cup in 2011–12 and 2012–13.

References

External links
 F.C. Ramat HaSharon Israeli Football Association 
 Forerunners: Hapoel Bnot Sakhnin – From Excluded Citizens to Beneficial Citizens Ye’ela Lahav-Raz, Israeli Sociology 14(2), 2013, pp. 267–287 
 Game of Freedom – Hapoel Bnot Sakhnin in Football Ye’ela Lahav-Raz and Shlomi Reznik, Wingate Academic College 
 Gender, Ethnicity and Nationalism in the Football Stadium: Hapoel Bnot Sakhnin Ye’ela Lahav-Raz, December 2008, Hebrew University 

Arab Israeli culture
Women's football clubs in Israel
Association football clubs established in 1999
1999 establishments in Israel